Tarleton Halt railway station was a short-lived station on the Tarleton Branch. It was situated near the River Asland and served as the terminus on the line. The site has long since been demolished and is now occupied by an industrial estate.

References

Lancashire and Yorkshire Railway
1912 establishments in the United Kingdom
1913 disestablishments in the United Kingdom